Manuel "Manny" Pardo Jr. (September 24, 1956 – December 11, 2012) was an American serial killer in South Florida, a former police officer who had previously been employed by the Florida Highway Patrol and later the Sweetwater Police Department in Miami-Dade county, active from January to April 1986, often working with partner, and co-defendant, Rolando Garcia. Over the course of those months, Pardo had nine known victims These events led to his arrest and conviction for 9 counts of first degree murder in the mid 1980s which he received the death penalty for, and ultimately his execution in December 2012.

Early life and police career 
Pardo was born in New York. According to USA Today, Pardo Who was a former Boy Scout and Marine Corps veteran, Who began his law enforcement career in the 1970s with the Florida Highway Patrol, graduating at the top of his class at the academy.  He was fired from that agency in 1979 for falsifying traffic tickets. He was soon hired by the police department in Sweetwater, a small city in Miami-Dade County."

Criminal career and trial 
After some brushes with law enforcement, including one incident involving lying to investigators, his position at the Sweetwater Police Department was terminated. Pardo became involved in the drug trade and, in January 1986, Pardo killed his first two known victims, Mario Amador and Roberto Alonso, with a .22 caliber Ruger pistol during a robbery 

Later that month, he killed Michael Millot, a Haitian anti-Duvalier activist, who Pardo believed to be a police informant. Millot was a gunsmith who had previously supplied Pardo with silencers for his handguns. Rolando Garcia lured Millot to the car of Pardo’s wife, where Pardo himself was already waiting in the back seat.  Once Michael Millot arrived and entered the front passenger seat of the car, Pardo fatally shot Millot in the head with a 9mm pistol. The car was later discovered to have been reupholstered after blood was cleaned out of it. 

In February 1986, he killed Luis Robledo and Ulpiano Ledo during a robbery of their home. Pardo had four victims in April 1986 in two separate incidents: Fara Quintero and Sara Musa were killed over an argument about a pawned ring worth $50 and for refusing to buy Pardo a VCR with stolen credit cards. Pardo would later claim that he believed Quintero had marked him for death by dialing him number 8s on a pager, a numerical sign for death in the Santería religion developed in Cuba. Ramon Alvero and his girlfriend Daisy Ricard were shot to death as Alvero failed to show up to several drug deals. 

Pardo was apprehended in New York City, found in a hospital with a bullet in his foot that matched those found in his final victims. The injury occurred when during the murder of Daisy Ricard, after shooting her once, Pardo’s .22 Ruger pistol jammed, so he bludgeoned Ricard with the handgun, causing the jammed round to discharge into Pardo’s foot. 

Pardo maintained until his death that his mission was to rid Florida of its drug culture by killing active sellers and buyers of drugs, admitting to at least six of the nine murders.

During his trial, against the advice of his attorneys, Pardo took the witness stand in his own defense. During this portion of the trial, Pardo claimed "I am a soldier, I accomplished my mission and I humbly ask you to give me the glory of ending my life and not send me to spend the rest of my days in state prison." Pardo "acknowledged that he killed all nine victims, but claimed that all nine victims were drug dealers who had no right to live and that he was doing society a favor." Prosecuting attorney David Waxman, on the other hand, maintained that Pardo was a "cold-blooded killer" and, according to the Clark County Prosecutor's site, "The State presented the case that Pardo and Garcia were drug dealers and were eliminating the competition."

Garcia was convicted of four counts of first degree murder and sentenced to death. However, he won a new trial in 2002. Among other reasons, Pardo claimed Garcia had no involvement in the murders. Garcia later pleaded guilty to four counts of second degree murder, received a 25-year sentence, and was released from prison on September 5, 2002.

Pardo was executed in Florida on December 11, 2012 by lethal injection, and was pronounced dead at 7:47 p.m. Manuel Pardo Jr. spent a total of 26 years on death row before his execution.

In popular culture 
In the 2015 top-down shooter video game Hotline Miami 2: Wrong Number, one of the playable characters is an unhinged Miami Police Department homicide detective named Manny Pardo, loosely based on his real life namesake, who uses his authority to go on killing sprees. Manny is shown to be seeking recognition for his crimes, wanting to be more infamous than other violent criminals making the news headlines in Miami. Detective Pardo is gradually revealed to be a serial killer dubbed by the press as the "Miami Mutilator", who investigates his own murders. When Pardo’s crimes do not initially receive much media attention, he escalates the brutality of his killings to achieve notoriety. Manny also personally kills other criminals who he fears will get more press coverage than him.

There has been speculation that Dexter Morgan, a fictional serial killer and vigilante who works as a forensics technician at the Miami Police Department, was inspired in part by Pardo due to their resemblance, and the similarity of being involved in law enforcement to some degree before their murder sprees, which were both motivated by vigilantism.

See also 
 List of people executed in Florida
 List of people executed in the United States in 2012
 List of serial killers in the United States

References 

1956 births
2012 deaths
1986 murders in the United States
20th-century American criminals
American people of Cuban descent
American police officers convicted of murder
Criminals from Florida
Criminals from New York (state)
Executed American serial killers
Male serial killers
People convicted of murder by Florida
People executed by Florida by lethal injection
People from Miami
People from New York City
Police officers executed for murder
Serial killers who worked in law enforcement